The technology industry in Puerto Rico represents 28.3% of the manufacturing sector in the economy of Puerto Rico.

History
In 1999, the technology sector in Puerto Rico was ranked 16th in exports and 37th in employment among the United States.

As a result of the Puerto Rican government-debt crisis, interest in revitalizing the economy through the technology sector was expressed, with Alberto Bacó Bagué describing it as "one of the pillars of our economic development program".

See also
Manufacturing in Puerto Rico
Pharmaceutical industry in Puerto Rico
Telecommunications in Puerto Rico

References

Economy of Puerto Rico